Collision is a 1932 British crime film directed by G. B. Samuelson and starring Sunday Wilshin and Henrietta Watson.

Cast
 Sunday Wilshin as Mrs. Oliver  
 Henrietta Watson as Mrs. Carruthers  
 L. Tippett as Mr. Carruthers  
 A. G. Poulton as Mr. Maynard  
 Irene Rooke as Mrs. Maynard  
 Gerald Rawlinson as Jack Carruthers  
 Peter Coleman as Brabazon  
 Wendy Barrie as Joyce

References

Bibliography
 Low, Rachael. Filmmaking in 1930s Britain. George Allen & Unwin, 1985.
 Wood, Linda. British Films, 1927-1939. British Film Institute, 1986.

External links
 

1932 films
British crime films
1932 crime films
1930s English-language films
Films directed by G. B. Samuelson
British black-and-white films
1930s British films